RMM may refer to;
 Mali, license plate code
 Rameswaram railway station (Indian Railways station code), in Tamil Nadu, India
 Riverside Metropolitan Museum, in Riverside, California, United States (previously Riverside Municipal Museum)
 Read-mostly memory, a type of memory
 Relative molecular mass, another name for molecular mass, the atomic weight of a molecule or compound
 RMM Records & Video, a former Latin music record label
 Remote monitoring and management, supervising and controlling software systems